Lineostriastiria olivalis is a species of moth in the family Noctuidae (the owlet moths). It was first described by William Barnes and James Halliday McDunnough in 1916 and it is found in North America.

The MONA or Hodges number for Lineostriastiria olivalis is 9757.

References

Further reading

 
 
 

Amphipyrinae
Articles created by Qbugbot
Moths described in 1916